Wahgunyah Conservation Park is a protected area located on the west coast of  South Australia about  west of the town of Fowlers Bay.  The conservation park is classified as an IUCN Category VI protected area.

References

Further reading
Parks of the Far West official brochure

External links
Wahgunyah Conservation Park official webpage
   Wahgunyah Conservation Park webpage on protected planet

Conservation parks of South Australia
Protected areas established in 2001
2001 establishments in Australia
Eyre Yorke Block
Nullarbor Plain